Namak Chal (also Romanized as Namak Chal) is a village in Miyan Kaleh Rural District, in the Central District of Behshahr County, Mazandaran Province, Iran. At the 2006 census, its population was 547, in 120 families.

References 

Populated places in Behshahr County